"Funky Music Sho' 'Nuff Turns Me On" is a 1971 funk/soul song written by Barrett Strong and Norman Whitfield, first and most successfully, recorded by Edwin Starr.

Chart performance

Cover versions
Other artists who have recorded the song include:
In 1972, The Temptations went to number 27 on the US soul chart, and was included on their All Directions album. 
In 1974, Yvonne Fair went to number 32 on the US soul chart, and was included on her The Bitch is Black album.
In 1977, Patti LaBelle included it on her Patti LaBelle album.
Utah Saints released a new version of the song (featuring Edwin Starr) as a single from their second album Two in 2000, which was featured in the video game FIFA 2001. This version went to number 23 on the UK Singles Chart.

References

Songs written by Norman Whitfield
Songs written by Barrett Strong
The Temptations songs
1971 singles
1971 songs
Edwin Starr songs
Motown singles